The Battle of Langfang was a battle in the Seymour Expedition during the Boxer Rebellion, in June 1900, involving Chinese imperial troops, the Chinese Muslim Kansu Braves and Boxers ambushing and defeating the Eight-Nation Alliance expeditionary army on its way to Beijing, pushing the Alliance forces to retreat back to Tientsin (Tianjin). The Alliance force at Langfang consisted of Germans.

Preceding clashes
The Chinese Imperial Tenacious Army under General Nie Shicheng was waging a brutal campaign to suppress the Boxers under orders from Commander in Chief Ronglu. At the same time General Nie was fighting the Boxers (Militia United in Righteousness, Yihetuan), the foreign Eight-Nation Alliance launched an invasion of China to reach the Legations at Beijing. The Imperial Court then decided to change its tack and halt the suppression campaign against the Boxers and fight the foreigners instead. There was too much bad blood between General Nie and the Boxers for them to cooperate with each other against the foreigners, so in response, the Imperial Court sent another Chinese Army, the Muslim Kansu Braves under the anti-foreign General Dong Fuxiang fight alongside the Boxers against the foreign Eight-Nation Alliance forces.

On June 6, 1900, the Boxers lost 480 dead in a battle after trying to block the passage of Chinese Imperial troops under General Nie Shicheng at a railway near Langfang.

At Langfang the Alliance forces arrived on June 11. However, their retreat routes had previously been damaged by Boxers' sabotage.

On June 11 and June 14, a large force of Boxers armed only with bladed melee weapons directly charged the Alliance troops at Langfang armed with rifles and machine guns in human wave attacks. During clashes at Langfang, Boxers armed with swords and spears charged the British and Americans, who were armed with guns.  At point-blank range one British soldier had to fire four bullets into a Boxer before he stopped, and American Capt. Bowman McCalla reported that single rifle shots were not enough: multiple rifle shots were needed to halt a Boxer. Only machine guns were effective in immediately stopping the Boxers.

The battle

Chinese account

Gen. Dong Fuxiang, along with his Chinese Muslim Braves, prepared to ambush the invading western army. The Muslim Gen. Ma Fuxiang and his brother Gen. Ma Fulu personally planned and led the attack, with a pincer movement around the Eight Nation Alliance force. On June 18, 1900, Dong Fuxiang's troops, stationed at Hunting Park in southern Beijing, attacked at multiple points including LangFang. The force of 5,000 included cavalrymen armed with modern rifles. They led a force of Hui Muslims, Dongxiang Muslims, and Baoan Muslims in the ambush at Langfang with Ma Fulu personally leading a cavalry charge, cutting down many enemy troops with his sword and decisively routing them.

Western account

The Boxers and Dong Fuxiang's army worked together in the joint ambush with the Boxers relentlessly assaulting the Allies head on with human wave attacks displaying "no fear of death" and engaging the Allies in melee combat and putting the Allied troops under severe mental stress by mimicking vigorous gunfire with firecrackers. The Allies however suffered most of their losses at the hands of General Dong's troops, who used their expertise and persistence to engage in "bold and persistent" assaults on the Alliance forces, as remembered by the German Captain Guido von Usedom and the right wing of the Germans was almost at the point of collapse under the attack until they were rescued from Langfang by French and British troops, and the Allies then retreated from Langfang in trains full of bullet holes. The foreign troops, especially the Germans, fought off the attack, killing 400 at a loss of seven dead and 57 wounded. The Kansu Braves lost 200 and the Boxers another 200. The Boxers directly and relentlessly charged the allies during the attack, which unnerved them. The need to care for the wounded, a lack of supplies and the likelihood of additional Chinese attacks resulted in Seymour and his officers deciding to retreat to Tientsin. The unexpected attack on Seymour by the Chinese army was prompted by an allied European and Japanese attack on the Dagu Forts two days beforehand. As a result of the attack in Dagu, the Chinese government had decided to resist Seymour's army and kill or expel all foreigners in northern China. The employment of firecrackers was part of ruses de guerre.

Carl Röchling drew a picture of Admiral Seymour commanding the retreat and Frank Craig drew a picture of the battle of Langfang.

It was this battle which led Seymour's forces to realize that the Chinese Imperial Army had joined the fight alongside the Boxers and played a role in his decision to retreat to Tientsin (Tianjin).

Aftermath
Near the end of June, local Boxers (unaffiliated with the Hebei Boxers) charged the British concession in Tianjin, not having learned the lesson from other Boxers' failed mystical offense. Nie Shicheng, who vehemently hated the rioting mobs, was nearby with his army. They stood by as the battle waged on. When the Boxers finally turned back from the Alliance forces under heavy machine gun pressure, Nie Shicheng ordered soldiers of the Wuwei Corps, ironically equipped with British machine guns as well, to spray their fire at the retreating Boxers, virtually annihilating the large mob. He gave the justification of "shooting all deserters". Then Nie finally brought his army to battle against the Alliance forces, but was unable to occupy the concessions.

As a consequence, in July, Nie was shot multiple times by mutinying new recruits in his army that sympathized with the Boxers. Soon afterwards he died under Allied troops' cannon fire; some claim this was a suicide, him having defied orders from pro-Boxer officials in the imperial court; while others regard it as a heroic military death.

References

Sources

External links
 34 THE GREAT VICTORY AT LANGFANG
 Battle of Langfang
 Exhibition Hall of Modern Warfare
 廊坊市

Conflicts in 1900
Battles of the Boxer Rebellion involving the United States
1900 in China
Battles of the Boxer Rebellion
United States Marine Corps in the 20th century
Anti-imperialism in Asia
June 1900 events